Welbourn (often misspelled Welbourne) is a suburb of New Plymouth, in the western North Island of New Zealand. It is located to the southeast of the city centre. Te Henui Stream runs through the suburb and State Highway 3 forms its western boundary.

The suburb began as a railway settlement.

Demographics

Welbourn had a population of 3,261 at the 2018 New Zealand census, an increase of 264 people (8.8%) since the 2013 census, and an increase of 465 people (16.6%) since the 2006 census. There were 1,215 households, comprising 1,701 males and 1,563 females, giving a sex ratio of 1.09 males per female. The median age was 40.4 years (compared with 37.4 years nationally), with 648 people (19.9%) aged under 15 years, 609 (18.7%) aged 15 to 29, 1,392 (42.7%) aged 30 to 64, and 612 (18.8%) aged 65 or older.

Ethnicities were 84.6% European/Pākehā, 14.5% Māori, 2.5% Pacific peoples, 7.9% Asian, and 1.6% other ethnicities. People may identify with more than one ethnicity.

The percentage of people born overseas was 18.9, compared with 27.1% nationally.

Although some people chose not to answer the census's question about religious affiliation, 49.7% had no religion, 37.7% were Christian, 0.5% had Māori religious beliefs, 1.5% were Hindu, 1.4% were Muslim, 0.6% were Buddhist and 1.5% had other religions.

Of those at least 15 years old, 573 (21.9%) people had a bachelor's or higher degree, and 450 (17.2%) people had no formal qualifications. The median income was $29,900, compared with $31,800 nationally. 483 people (18.5%) earned over $70,000 compared to 17.2% nationally. The employment status of those at least 15 was that 1,164 (44.5%) people were employed full-time, 456 (17.5%) were part-time, and 81 (3.1%) were unemployed.

Education
The Western Institute of Technology at Taranaki has its main campus in Welbourn.

New Plymouth Boys' High School is a single-sex state secondary school (years 9–13) with a roll of  students. The school was built as New Plymouth High School in 1882 and was initially only for boys. It became co-educational in 1885, although the girls were taught separately for the first two years. The girls separated from New Plymouth High School in 1914, forming New Plymouth Girls' High School in Strandon, leaving New Plymouth Boys' High School on the old site.

Central School opened in 1884 and is one of the oldest schools in the region.

Welbourn School is a coeducational contributing primary (years 1-6) school with a roll of  students.  It was built on railway reserve land in 1932 and celebrated its 75th jubilee in 2008.

Rolls are as of

Notes

Further reading

General historical works

Schools

External links
 Highlands Intermediate website
 Welbourn School website

Suburbs of New Plymouth